NGC 316 is a star located in the constellation Pisces. It was discovered on November 29, 1850 by Bindon Stoney.

References

0316
18501129
Pisces (constellation)